Asymmetric Publications is a video game developer and publisher. It made the web-based role-playing game Kingdom of Loathing.

Asymmetric is run by Zack Johnson (known as Jick in-game). Employees of the company are known as the Asymmetric Team. As a result of the popularity of the game, Asymmetric currently supports Johnson and a few other individuals as full-time employees.

In the past, Asymmetric Publications hosted various games and other attractions, including Infinity Plus One, an online fortune teller, Bee On Drugs, a bee who rambles, and Krakrox the Barbarian, a game noted as the precursor to Kingdom of Loathing.

A running gag was that the Asymmetric Publications' website was not updated for almost six years after the announcement of a "fun new game," Kingdom of Loathing. In late 2008, it began to be updated again.

The employees of Asymmetric Publications formerly produced several weekly podcasts. One of them was related to Kingdom of Loathing, while the others were general shows about video games, pop culture, advice, and parenting. These latter podcasts were collected under an umbrella called the Hot Dog Network.

A second game, Word Realms was developed between 2008 and 2012, and was released on May 21, 2013.

In 2016, a third game, West of Loathing, was announced on Steam Greenlight. It was released in August 2017.

In 2019, Johnson was accused of "physical and emotional" abuse by his ex-wife, U.C. Santa Cruz professor A.M. Darke, towards her and West of Loathing designer Kevin Simmons. She also alleged that he had removed part of the game to avoid crediting her for its development. Johnson denied the allegations of physical abuse, although admitting to "emotional immaturity and anger and cruelty" in a written apology. He later added Darke to the game's credits, claiming she had only provided feedback to the game and did not work on it in a design capacity. An ex-girlfriend of Johnson's, Bonnie Mattson, also alleged similar abusive behavior during a 2005 relationship.

In 2022, a fourth game, Shadows Over Loathing, was released on Steam.

List of games

References

External links
Asymmetric.net
The Hot Dog Network Podcasts
Krakrox the Barbarian
Kingdom of Loathing Homepage

Video game development companies
Video game publishers